Paula Wrońska (born 1 December 1991) is a Polish sports shooter. She competed in the Women's 10 metre air rifle event at the 2012 Summer Olympics.

Olympic results

References

1991 births
Living people
Polish female sport shooters
Olympic shooters of Poland
Shooters at the 2012 Summer Olympics
People from Lębork
Sportspeople from Pomeranian Voivodeship
European Games competitors for Poland
Shooters at the 2015 European Games
21st-century Polish women